Dancheng County is a county in eastern Henan province, China. It is under the administration of Zhoukou city.

Administrative divisions
As 2012, this county is divided to 9 towns and 11 townships.
Towns

Townships

Climate

References

 
County-level divisions of Henan
Zhoukou